Johannes-Saß-Preis is a German scientific and literary prize, named after Johannes Sass, a linguist who specialized in the Low German language.

German literary awards

de:Johannes Saß#Sonstiges